"Real Nigga Roll Call" (edited version titled as "Real N***a Roll Call" and Roll Call) is a single by Lil Jon & the East Side Boyz, off their album Crunk Juice featuring Ice Cube.

Record
The song once held a Guinness record for "Most swear words in a song" with 295 expletives. Psychostick currently now holds the record with their song N.S.F.W. with over 500 expletives.

References
<

External links

Lil Jon songs
Hip hop songs
2004 singles
Songs written by Ice Cube
Songs written by Lil Jon
2004 songs
Gangsta rap songs
Crunk songs